Intraepithelial neoplasia (IEN) is the development of a benign neoplasia or high-grade dysplasia in an epithelium. The exact dividing line between dysplasia and neoplasia has been very difficult to draw throughout the era of medical science. It varies between persons. In the localizations shown below, the term intraepithelial neoplasia is used to describe more accurately what was historically referred to as epithelial dysplasia. IEN is not cancer, but it is associated with higher risk for developing cancer in future. It is thus sometimes a precancerous condition.

Localizations

References

Lesion